Thibaut Cillard (born 23 December 1995) is a French professional footballer who plays as a defender for Championnat National 2 club Saint-Malo. He will join Saint-Malo on 1 July 2022.

Career 
Cillard was released from his contract by Tours in November 2018.

In 2022, one year after leaving the club, Cillard made his return to Saint-Malo.

References

1995 births
Living people
Association football defenders
French footballers
Ligue 2 players
Championnat National players
Championnat National 2 players
Championnat National 3 players
Tours FC players
US Avranches players
US Saint-Malo players
Olympique Saint-Quentin players